David Lee Goldfein (born December 21, 1959) is a retired United States Air Force four-star general who last served as the 21st chief of staff of the Air Force. He previously served as the vice chief of staff of the Air Force and, prior to that, he served as the director of the Joint Staff, a position within the Joint Chiefs of Staff who assists the chairman of the Joint Chiefs of Staff. Goldfein retired from the Air Force on October 1, 2020, after over 37 years of service.

Early life and education
Born at Laon-Couvron Air Base in France, Goldfein is the son of William Michael "Goldie" Goldfein (November 26, 1931 – June 19, 2019) and Mary Vanni. His paternal grandfather, Boatswain's mate second class Joseph William Goldfein (June 25, 1896 – June 19, 1974), served in World War I with the United States Navy, and his father was a colonel in the Air Force from 1949 to 1982 and fought in the Vietnam War. After his retirement, Goldfein's father worked for the Combined Federal Campaign in Las Vegas for 5 years and then the Link Aviation Devices in Binghamton, New York for 5 years. His elder brother, Stephen M. Goldfein also served in the Air Force from 1978 to 2008, retiring as a major general; Stephen Goldfein also served as Director of the Joint Staff, a position his brother David would later hold. David Goldfein received his commission from the United States Air Force Academy, where he received a B.S. degree in philosophy in 1983. He is also a graduate of the U.S. Air Force Weapons School at Nellis AFB. He is a Distinguished Eagle Scout and former ranger at the Philmont Scout Ranch.

Military career

Goldfein is a Command Pilot with more than 4,200 flying hours with the T-37, T-38, F-16C/D, F-117A, MC-12W, and MQ-9.

Goldfein commanded United States Air Forces Central, Shaw AFB, SC and Al Udeid AB, Qatar; 49th Fighter Wing, Holloman AFB, NM; 52d Fighter Wing, Spangdahlem AB, Germany; 366th Operations Group, Mountain Home AFB, ID; and the 555th Fighter Squadron, Aviano AB, Italy.

Goldfein flew combat missions during the Gulf War, and later deployed to the Vicenza Combined Air Operations Center for Operation Deliberate Force. As commander of the 555th Fighter Squadron, he led his squadron flying an F-16 fighter in Operation Allied Force. During the operation, on 2 May 1999, Goldfein's F-16 was shot down over western Serbia by a S-125 surface-to-air missile fired by the 3rd Battery of the 250th Air Defense Missile Brigade of the Yugoslav Air Force. Goldfein successfully ejected, and was subsequently rescued by NATO helicopters.

Chief of Staff of the Air Force 

On April 26, 2016, Defense Secretary Ash Carter announced that President Obama had nominated Goldfein to succeed General Mark Welsh as the 21st Chief of Staff of the Air Force. Goldfein's experience as a consensus builder, as well as his role in formulating the Air Force's contributions to the Defense Department's third offset strategy were cited by Carter and Secretary of the Air Force Deborah Lee James as reasons for his selection. His confirmation hearing took place on June 16, and he succeeded Welsh on July 1, two days after his confirmation. 

As CSAF, Goldfein spearheaded the Joint All-Domain Command and Control (JADC2) and Advanced Battle Management (ABMS) systems, designed to connect service-level networks, platforms and sensors into a network for communicating battle information across the joint force. The aim of rapidly connecting all aircraft data and sensors to each other, as well as, to other military assets was a special focus of the subject as he led the service. He prioritized restoring the squadron as the principal warfighting unit of the Air Force, giving squadron commanders greater autonomy over their units, standardizing squadron command responsibilities and delegating more financial resources to squadron-level activities. Goldfein also led a proposal to increase from 312 to 386 operational squadrons. In September 2016, Goldfein personally selected the name "Raider" from more than 2000 naming submissions for the prototype B-21 bomber, in honor of the Doolittle Raiders. 

Goldfein initially opposed the creation of an independent space force, concerned that the creation of a new service branch would, through competition for a larger share of the Defense budget, compromise joint warfighting capability in the space domain. He remarked that establishing the Space Force would create a "balancing act" of building a service branch based on joint warfighting capability while simultaneously developing its own service culture. He eventually became supportive of the plan upon engagement with field commanders at Maxwell Air Force Base, many of whom supported the need for a separate service branch. Goldfein said in an interview with National Defense that "a service chief singularly focused on space, space operations and space integration" could expedite military profitability in the space domain more efficiently than under the umbrella of the Air Force. 

In August 2017, Goldfein joined other members of the Joint Chiefs of Staff in condemning racism in the wake of the Unite the Right rally in Charlottesville, which was organized by an ex-Marine. In June 2020, Goldfein publicly denounced the murder of George Floyd in a memo, calling it a "national tragedy" and adding that Americans "should be outraged" at the brutality shown during the incident. He supported his senior enlisted advisor, Chief Kaleth O. Wright, who responded to Floyd's murder on social media. Alongside Air Force secretary Barbara Barrett, Goldfein subsequently directed an inspector general investigation into racial inequality and advancement opportunities for African-Americans in the Air Force. 

Goldfein's term as Air Force chief of staff ended on August 6, 2020, and he was succeeded by General Charles Q. Brown Jr., who was confirmed in June. He retired in October of the same year.

Candidate for Chairman of the Joint Chiefs of Staff
Goldfein was a candidate to replace General Joseph Dunford as Chairman of the Joint Chiefs of Staff in 2019. He was favored for the appointment by both Dunford and Secretary of Defense Jim Mattis. President Donald Trump, who was feuding with Mattis, nominated General Mark Milley instead. Goldfein did not express any rancor over not being selected, stating that the president had "the absolute right and responsibility to pick the principal military adviser that he wants."

Post-retirement
Three and a half months after retiring, Goldfein joined the investment firm Blackstone.  He also began serving as a Senior Fellow at the Johns Hopkins Applied Physics Laboratory in March 2021. In March 2023, Goldfein joined Shield Capital's National Security Advisory Board, alongside LTG (ret) H.R. McMaster, Letitia 'Tish' Long, ADM (ret) James Stavridis and The Honorable Sean Stackley.

Assignments

October 1983 – October 1984, student, undergraduate pilot training, Sheppard AFB, Texas
October 1984 – February 1988, T-38 instructor pilot, 90th Flying Training Squadron, Sheppard AFB, Texas
February 1988 – January 1992, F-16 instructor pilot and flight commander, 17th Tactical Fighter Squadron, Shaw AFB, S.C.
January 1992 – June 1992, student, USAF Fighter Weapons Instructor Course, Nellis AFB, Nev.
June 1992 – July 1994, squadron weapons officer and Chief, Wing Weapons and Tactics, 366th Composite Wing, Mountain Home AFB, Idaho
July 1994 – June 1995, student, Air Command and Staff College, Maxwell AFB, Ala.
June 1995 – May 1996, special assistant to the Commander, Allied Air Forces Southern Europe and Sixteenth Air Force, Naples, Italy
May 1996 – August 1997, executive officer to the Commander, U.S. Air Forces in Europe, Ramstein Air Base, Germany
August 1997 – June 1998, operations officer, 555th Fighter Squadron, Aviano AB, Italy
June 1998 – July 2000, Commander, 555th Fighter Squadron, Aviano AB, Italy
July 2000 – June 2001, student, National Defense Fellow, State Department Senior Seminar, Arlington, Va.
July 2001 – July 2002, Deputy Division Chief, Combat Forces, Headquarters U.S. Air Force, Washington, D.C.
August 2002 – July 2004, Commander, 366th Operations Group, Mountain Home AFB, Idaho
July 2004 – June 2006, Commander, 52d Fighter Wing, Spangdahlem AB, Germany
June 2006 – January 2008, Commander, 49th Fighter Wing, Holloman AFB, N.M.
January 2008 – August 2009, Deputy Director of Programs, Office of the Deputy Chief of Staff for Strategic Plans and Programs, Headquarters U.S. Air Force, Washington D.C.
August 2009 – August 2011, Director of Operations, Air Combat Command, Joint Base Langley-Eustis, Va.
August 2011 – July 2013, Commander, U.S. Air Forces Central Command, Southwest Asia
August 2013 – August 2015, Director, Joint Staff, the Pentagon, Washington, D.C.
August 2015 – July 2016, Vice Chief of Staff of the U.S. Air Force, Washington, D.C.
July 2016 – August 2020, Chief of Staff of the U.S. Air Force, Washington, D.C.

Awards and decorations

Effective dates of promotion

References

External links

|-

|-

|-

|-

|-

1959 births
21st-century American Jews
Air War College alumni
Jewish American military personnel
Chiefs of Staff of the United States Air Force
Grand Cordons of the Order of the Rising Sun
Living people
Recipients of the Air Force Distinguished Service Medal
Recipients of the Air Medal
Recipients of the Defense Distinguished Service Medal
Recipients of the Distinguished Flying Cross (United States)
Recipients of the Humanitarian Service Medal
Recipients of the Legion of Merit
Shot-down aviators
United States Air Force Academy alumni
United States Air Force generals
Vice Chiefs of Staff of the United States Air Force